The Bishop of Down was an episcopal title which took its name from the town of Downpatrick in Northern Ireland. The bishop's seat (Cathedra) was located on the site of the present cathedral church of the Holy and Undivided Trinity in the Church of Ireland.

The title is now united with other bishoprics. In the Church of Ireland it is held by the Bishop of Down and Dromore, and in the Roman Catholic Church it is held by the Bishop of Down and Connor.

History
The diocese of Down was one of the twenty-four dioceses established at the Synod of Rathbreasail in 1111 and comprised roughly the eastern half of County Down. For a brief period in the early 12th-century, Down was united with the see of Connor under Máel Máedóc Ua Morgair (Saint Malachy), who also became Archbishop of Armagh.

On 29 July 1439, plans for a permanent union of the sees of Down and Connor were submitted to King Henry VI of England for his sanction. Exactly twelve months later, 29 July 1439, Pope Eugene IV issued a papal bull stating that Down and Connor were to be united on the death or resignation of either bishop. On 29 May 1441, Archbishop Prene of Armagh sent a letter to Pope Eugene IV in which he writes about the crimes and excesses of Bishop John Sely of Down, one of which was that Sely was living openly with Lettice Thomas, a married woman, at Kilclief Castle. Following receiving the letter, the pope deprived Bishop Sely of the see of Down at some date before November 1442, and thereby effecting the union of the two dioceses. John Fossade, who had been bishop of Connor since 1431, became the bishop of the united see of Down and Connor in late 1442. However, there was strong local opposition to the union, and Archbishop Prene's register shows that he also was for a time opposed to the union. There were three more bishops of Down were appointed before the two sees finally united.

After the Reformation in Ireland, Down and Connor had parallel episcopal successions. In the Roman Catholic Church, Down remains united with Connor to the present today. But in the Church of Ireland, they united further with Dromore in 1842 to form the bishopric of Down, Connor and Dromore. They continued until 1945 when they were separated into the bishopric of Down and Dromore and the bishopric of Connor.

List of bishops

See also

Down Cathedral
Roman Catholic Diocese of Down and Connor
Church of Ireland Diocese of Down and Dromore

References

Down
Religion in County Down
Roman Catholic Diocese of Down and Connor
Diocese of Down and Dromore
Bishops of Down or Connor or of Dromore
Former Roman Catholic bishoprics in Ireland